Chauk Township is a township of Magway District in the Magway Division of Burma (Myanmar). The principal town and administrative seat is Chauk.

Borders
Chauk Township is bounded by the following townships:
 Seikpyu Township to the northwest;
 Pakokku Township to the north;
 Nyaung-U Township, Mandalay Region, to the northeast;
 Kyaukpadaung Township, Mandalay Region, to the east;
 Yenangyaung Township to the south; and
 Salin Township to the west.

Notes

External links
 "Chauk Township, Magway Division" map ID: MIMU345v01, creation date:17 December 2009, Myanmar Information Management Unit (MIMU), showing major towns and villages with village tracts.
 "Chauk Google Satellite Map" Maplandia World Gazetteer

Townships of Magway Region